Lake Armington is a  water body in the town of Piermont, in Grafton County on the western edge of the White Mountains in New Hampshire, United States. Water from Lake Armington flows north  into Lake Tarleton, then west via Eastman Brook to the Connecticut River.

Camp Walt Whitman is located at the south end of the lake. The Appalachian Trail passes over Ore Hill about one mile east of the lake.

The lake is classified as a warmwater fishery, with observed species including rainbow trout, brown trout, smallmouth bass, chain pickerel, and horned pout. Boat access is available at the northeast end of the lake, off New Hampshire Route 25C.

See also

List of lakes in New Hampshire

References

Lakes of Grafton County, New Hampshire
Lakes of New Hampshire